Aonosato Sakari (born Sakari Ogasawara; November 13, 1935 – May 16, 2008) was a sumo wrestler from Kuraishi, Aomori, Japan. He made his professional debut in March 1953, and reached the top division in January 1959. His highest rank was sekiwake. Upon retirement from active competition he became an elder in the Japan Sumo Association under the name Hatachiyama. In 1988 he took over as head coach at Tatsutagawa stable from former yokozuna Kagamisato and became Tatsutagawa-oyakata. Two months prior to reaching the Sumo Association's mandatory retirement age of 65 in November 2000, Tatsutagawa stable was shut down and the remaining wrestlers transferred to Michinoku stable.

His son Moriyuki was born in 1970 and also became a sumo wrestler, reaching a highest rank of makushita 42 under the ring name of Fusanosato.

Career record
The Kyushu tournament was first held in 1957, and the Nagoya tournament in 1958.

See also
Glossary of sumo terms
List of past sumo wrestlers
List of sumo tournament second division champions
List of sekiwake

References

1935 births
Japanese sumo wrestlers
Sumo people from Aomori Prefecture
Sekiwake
2008 deaths